Compton Unified School District is a school district headquartered in Compton, California, United States.

The district serves Compton, portions of Paramount, portions of Carson, and the unincorporated Los Angeles County neighborhoods of West Compton and East Compton.

History

In 1993 the State of California offered to loan the school district $20 million in exchange for temporary control of the school district; the rationale for wanting to take control included both financial problems and poor academic performance, making Compton USD the only California school district to ever have a takeover for both reasons. The state had complete control over the school district. Test scores had a modest increase as a result. In 1997 Jeff Leeds of the Los Angeles Times wrote that the physical conditions of the campuses had deteriorated since the takeover. Delaine Eastin, the California State Superintendent of Public Instruction, decided not to close the school district despite receiving requests to do so. By 1997 Compton USD began to repay the loan.

Schools

Continuation schools
 Cesar Chavez Continuation High School (Unincorporated area)

Secondary schools

High schools
Zoned
 Centennial High School (Compton)
 Compton High School (Compton)
 Manuel Dominguez High School (Unincorporated area)
 Compton Early College High School (Compton)
Alternative
 Compton Community Day High School (Unincorporated area)

Middle schools
Zoned
Ralph J. Bunche Middle School (Unincorporated area)
 Benjamin O. Davis, Jr. Middle School (Compton)
Enterprise Middle School (Compton)
Franklin D. Roosevelt Middle School (Compton)
Frank L. Walton Middle School (Compton)
Franklin S. Whaley Middle School (Unincorporated area)
Willowbrook Middle School (Compton)
Alternative
 Compton Community Day Middle School (Unincorporated area)

Primary schools
Zoned, K-5
Ralph Bunche Elementary School (Carson)
Charles W. Bursch Elementary School (Compton)
George Washington Carver Elementary School (Unincorporated area)
William Jefferson Clinton Elementary School (Paramount)
Clarence A. Dickison Elementary School (Compton)
Ralph Waldo Emerson Elementary School (Compton)
Stephen C. Foster Elementary School (Compton)
Jefferson Elementary School (Unincorporated area)
Colin P. Kelly Elementary School (Compton)
Robert F. Kennedy Elementary School (Compton)
Martin Luther King Jr. Elementary School (Unincorporated area)
Laurel Street Elementary School (Compton)
Henry Longfellow Elementary School (Compton)
Augusta A. Mayo Elementary School (Compton)
McKinley Elementary School (Unincorporated area)
Ronald E. McNair Elementary School (Compton)
Theodore Roosevelt Elementary School (Compton)
General Rosecrans Elementary School (Compton)
Ardella B. Tibby Elementary School (Compton)
George Washington Elementary School (Unincorporated area)
Zoned, 3-5
Augusta A. Mayo Elementary School (Compton)

See also

List of school districts in Los Angeles County, California
Ted Kimbrough, former superintendent

References

External links

 
School districts in Los Angeles County, California
Compton, California